Anne Camille La Flamme is a New Zealand immunologist. She is currently a professor at the Malaghan Institute at Victoria University of Wellington in New Zealand. She has a MSc entitled 'Interleukin-2 production by transgenic Trypanosoma cruzi : molecular and biochemical characterization' and a PhD entitled 'Trypanosoma cruzi-infected macrophages are defective in class II antigen presentation,' both from the University of Washington.

Selected works 
 Hesse, Matthias, Manuel Modolell, Anne C. La Flamme, Marco Schito, José Manuel Fuentes, Allen W. Cheever, Edward J. Pearce, and Thomas A. Wynn. "Differential regulation of nitric oxide synthase-2 and arginase-1 by type 1/type 2 cytokines in vivo: granulomatous pathology is shaped by the pattern of L-arginine metabolism." The Journal of Immunology 167, no. 11 (2001): 6533–6544.
 Buckner, Frederick S., C. L. Verlinde, Anne C. La Flamme, and Wesley C. Van Voorhis. "Efficient technique for screening drugs for activity against Trypanosoma cruzi using parasites expressing beta-galactosidase." Antimicrobial Agents and Chemotherapy 40, no. 11 (1996): 2592–2597.
 La Flamme, Anne Camille, Kate Ruddenklau, and B. Thomas Bäckström. "Schistosomiasis decreases central nervous system inflammation and alters the progression of experimental autoimmune encephalomyelitis." Infection and Immunity 71, no. 9 (2003): 4996–5004.
 La Flamme, Anne Camille, Elisabeth A. Patton, Beverley Bauman, and Edward J. Pearce. "IL-4 plays a crucial role in regulating oxidative damage in the liver during schistosomiasis." The Journal of Immunology 166, no. 3 (2001): 1903–1911.

References

External links
 
 institutional homepage
 institutional homepage

Living people
New Zealand women academics
New Zealand immunologists
Academic staff of the Victoria University of Wellington
University of Washington alumni
Year of birth missing (living people)
New Zealand women writers